Stan Mikawos (born May 11, 1958) is a former Canadian football player.  A native of Winnipeg, Manitoba, Mikawos played college football at North Dakota.  He played professional football in the Canadian Football League as a defensive tackle for the Winnipeg Blue Bombers from 1982 to 1996.  During his time with the Blue Bombers, the team won three Grey Cup championships in 1984, 1988 and 1990. In the 1984 Grey Cup game, Mikawos recovered a fumble and ran 22 yards for a touchdown to give the Bombers a 24-17 lead.  He was inducted into the Winnipeg Football Club Hall of Fame in 2000.  Mikawos currently resides in Los Cabos, Mexico, where he sells timeshares.

References

1958 births
Living people
Canadian football defensive linemen
Polish emigrants to Canada
Canadian players of Canadian football
North Dakota Fighting Hawks football players
Polish players of Canadian football
Winnipeg Blue Bombers players
Sportspeople from Gdańsk
Canadian football people from Winnipeg